Loxostege rhabdalis is a moth in the family Crambidae. It was described by George Hampson in 1900. It is found in China and Mongolia.

Subspecies
Loxostege rhabdalis rhabdalis (China: Xinjiang)
Loxostege rhabdalis rubrotinctalis Caradja, 1935 (Mongolia)

References

Moths described in 1900
Pyraustinae